The Gospel of the Flesh is a 2013 Peruvian crime thriller drama film directed by Eduardo Mendoza de Echave. It was selected as the Peruvian entry for the Best Foreign Language Film at the 87th Academy Awards, but was not nominated. It premiered on 17 October 2013 in Lima and several other provinces.

The film won three awards at the 17th Lima Film Festival: Audience Award, Titra Award and the Association of Communicators Award.

See also
 List of submissions to the 87th Academy Awards for Best Foreign Language Film
 List of Peruvian submissions for the Academy Award for Best Foreign Language Film

References

External links
 

2013 films
2013 thriller drama films
2013 crime drama films
Peruvian thriller drama films
Peruvian crime drama films
La Soga Producciones films
2010s Spanish-language films
2010s Peruvian films